Drum pump, barrel pump, and transfer pump refer to pumps that are used to empty barrels, tanks, IBCs and drums. Many liquids used on manufacturing and processing plants are delivered in 100 or 200 litre barrels and are too heavy to tip to empty the liquids inside. Drum pumps range from simple siphon based devices to sophisticated highly-engineered machinery.

Considerations
 Function - Is the purpose simply to empty the drum completely in one operation, to allow dispense-on-demand operations, or to provide a metered flow to a subsequent operations?  Flow rate, pressure, control systems, etc.  need to be specified.
 Liquid being pumped - Product viscosity determines the type of pump mechanism.  Heavy viscous liquids usually require positive displacement pumping head.
 Special product characteristics - Acids, corrosives, or reactive liquids need special materials in the drum pumps.  Food and pharmaceutical liquids also need special materials as well as a means of regular cleaning and sanitizing.  Flammable liquids require special handling.

Manual
Low cost manual pumps are used when product dispensing is periodically needed.  Crank and lever driven pumps are available. Double-action piston drum pumps can be self priming, delivering liquid on both the forward and the back stroke.

Powered
Unlike a submersible pump with the motor submerged, a drum pump has a drive motor above the container.  Electric and pneumatic motors are available.  The motor is attached to the vertical shaft at the top of the tube outside the drum and the pumping element is located at the end of the shaft inside the drum.  This configuration allows the drum to be emptied without tipping and so reduces the risk of spills and operator injury.

Hot melt drum pump
Some materials are solid at ambient temperatures and must be melted to allow pumping.  This might include open-head drums of hot-melt adhesive, heavy grease, etc.  Several systems have been developed which use a heated platen placed on the material;  the melted material is then pumped through a heated hose to its destination.

See also
Pump dispenser

References

 Hicks, Tyler G. and Theodore W. Edwards. Pump Application Engineering. McGraw-Hill Book Company.1971.

External links

Pumps
Fuel containers
Shipping containers
Packaging machinery